John Martin Papworth MSM (8 November 1894 – 13 November 1942) was an English professional footballer who played as a forward in the Football League for Fulham and Watford.

Personal life 
During the First World War, Papworth served as a private in the London Regiment and latterly as a company sergeant major in the Machine Gun Corps. He was awarded the Meritorious Service Medal. At the time of his death, Papworth was the landlord of The Mechanics Arms pub in Deptford.

Career statistics

References

1894 births
1942 deaths
Footballers from Deptford
English Football League players
Fulham F.C. players
Watford F.C. players
Dartford F.C. players
British Army personnel of World War I
London Regiment soldiers
Machine Gun Corps soldiers
Recipients of the Meritorious Service Medal (United Kingdom)
Association football forwards
Association football wing halves
English footballers
Military personnel from London